Sardar Vallabhbhai Patel International School of Textiles and Management (SVPITM) is an autonomous institution under the Indian Ministry of Textiles. It was established on December 24, 2002, in Coimbatore, Tamil Nadu and is approved by AICTE. Its courses focus on textiles and textile management education.

School Director
There is no permanent director for this institute.

The current director is C. Rameshkumar, who has published 50 plus papers in Indian and international journals. He has conducted research work on the cut resistance behaviour of DREF yarn fabrics. He previously served at Parisutham Institute of Technology and Science, Thanjavur as Director of Academics.

When Rameshkumar's term as a director is over, he will be succeeded by MK Gandhi who is currently acting director. Gandhi previously worked in NIFT in Chennai.

Achievements
SVPITM has been identified as the nodal centre for conducting workshops on technical textiles by the Government of Tamil Nadu.

Ranking
Rated as good in the survey by Business India
Rated by A4 by Indian Management

Courses Offered
 BSc in Textiles and Technical Textiles
 BBA in Textile Business Analytics
 MBA in Textile Management
 MBA in Apparel Management
 MBA in Retail Management
 MBA in Technical Textile Management

Demand for merging with CUTN 
In February 2020, nearly 100 students petitioned against then district collector K. Rajamani during the grievances redress day meeting. They demanded the merger of the institute with the Central University of Tamil Nadu (CUTN). The students alleged that the Ministry of Textiles had not issued any order to CUTN despite approval from a Cabinet Committee. The aggrieved students boycotted classes for two weeks in protest.

References

External links
 Sardar Vallabhbhai Patel International School of Textiles and Management, Website 

Textile schools in India
Ministry of Textiles
Business schools in Tamil Nadu
Universities and colleges in Coimbatore
Educational institutions established in 2002
2002 establishments in Tamil Nadu
Textile industry in Tamil Nadu